Nicotryine is lesser known and minor tobacco alkaloid. It inhibits metabolism of nicotine through CYP2A6 enzyme inhibition (Ki = 7.5 ± 2.9). It also inhibits CYP2A13 (Ki = 5.6 ± 0.86) which might play role in nicotine metabolism. Nicotyrine is formed by gradual oxidation of nicotine in e-liquids and causes delayed nicotine clearance and attenuated withdrawal symptoms.

It has insecticidal properties like nicotine and certain derivatives have been synthesized for that property.

Chemistry
alpha-nicotyrine and beta-nicotyrine are positional isomers of each other.

Synthesis
Nicotyrine can be produced readily from nicotine by catalytic dehydrogenation and from tobacco biomass by catalytic pyrolysis.

See also 
 Myosmine

References 

Pyridine alkaloids
Pyrroles
3-Pyridyl compounds